is a retired Japanese film director, originally associated with the Shochiku Studio, who came to prominence as part of the Japanese New Wave in the 1960s.

Early life
Shinoda attended Waseda University, where he studied theater and also participated in the Hakone Ekiden long distance race.

Career
He joined the Shōchiku Studio in 1953 as an assistant director, where he worked on films by such directors as Yasujirō Ozu. He debuted as a director in 1960 with One-Way Ticket for Love, which he also scripted. 

His focus on youth and the cultural and political turmoil of 1960s Japan made him a central figure in the Shōchiku New Wave alongside Nagisa Ōshima and Yoshishige Yoshida. He worked in a variety of genres, from the yakuza film (Pale Flower) to the samurai film (Assassination), but he particularly became known for his focus on socially marginal characters and for an interest in traditional Japanese theater, which found its greatest expression in Double Suicide, in which actors are manipulated like Bunraku puppets. He also was interested in sports, directing a documentary on the 1972 Winter Olympics. Also known for his collaborations with such artists as Shūji Terayama and Tōru Takemitsu, Shinoda left Shōchiku in 1965 to form his own production company, Hyōgensha.

Awards
His film Gonza the Spearman (1986) was entered into the 36th Berlin International Film Festival, where it won the Silver Bear for an outstanding artistic contribution. He won the 1991 Japan Academy Prize for Director of the Year for Childhood Days. His film Moonlight Serenade (1997) was entered into the 47th Berlin International Film Festival. He also won the Izumi Kyōka Prize in 2010 for a novel (Shinoda himself had earlier adapted a Kyōka novel for the screen for the 1979 film Demon Pond).

Personal life
Masahiro Shinoda's first marriage was with Kazuko Shiraishi, both had a daughter.
In 1967 he married the actress Shima Iwashita, who appears in several of his films. He retired from directing after the release of Spy Sorge in 2003, a biopic on the life of Richard Sorge.

Filmography
 One-Way Ticket to Love (恋の片道切符) (1960)
 Kawaita mizuumi (乾いた湖) (Dry Lake a.k.a. Youth in Fury) (1960)
 My Face Red in the Sunset (a.k.a. Killers on Parade) (夕陽に赤い俺の顔) (1961)
 Love New and Old (三味線とオートバイ) (1961)
 Our Marriage (私たちの結婚) (1961)
 Epitaph to My Love (わが恋の旅路) (1961)
 Tears on the Lion's Mane (涙を、獅子のたて髪に) a.k.a A Flame at the Pier (1962)
 Glory on the Summit (山の讃歌 燃ゆる若者たち) (1962)
 Kawaita hana (乾いた花) (Withered Flower, a.k.a. Pale Flower) (1964)
 Ansatsu (暗殺) (Assassination) (1964)
 With Beauty and Sorrow (美しさと哀しみと) (1965)
 Ibun Sarutobi Sasuke (異聞猿飛佐助) (The Strange Story of Sarutobi Sasuke, a.k.a. Samurai Spy) (1965)
 Captive's Island a.k.a. Punishment Island (処刑の島) (1966)
 Clouds at Sunset (あかね雲) (1967)
 Shinjū ten no Amijima (心中天網島) (Amijima Effaced to Heaven by Lovers' Suicide, a.k.a. Double Suicide) (1969)
 The Scandalous Adventures of Buraikan (無頼漢) (1970)
 Chinmoku / Silence (沈黙 / Silence) (1971)
 Sapporo Winter Olympics (札幌オリンピック) (1972)
 The Petrified Forest (化石の森) (1973)
 Himiko (卑弥呼) (1974)
 Under the Blossoming Cherry Trees (桜の森の満開の下) (1975)
 Ballad of Orin (はなれ瞽女おりん) (1977)
 Demon Pond (夜叉ケ池) (1979)
 Akuryo Island (悪霊島) (1981)
 MacArthur's Children (瀬戸内少年野球団) (1984)
 ALLUSION～ 転生譚 (1985)
 Gonza the Spearman (近松門左衛門 鑓の権三) (1986)
 The Dancing Girl (舞姫) (1989)
 Childhood Days (少年時代) (1990)
 Sharaku (写楽 Sharaku) (1995)
 Setouchi Moonlight Serenade (1997)
 Owls' Castle  (1999)
 Spy Sorge (2003)

Film availability
 Kawaita hana (乾いた花) (Withered Flower, a.k.a. Pale Flower) (1964)
DVD: Region 1 NTSC: Home Vision Entertainment (US)
 Ansatsu (暗殺) (Assassination) (1964)
DVD: Region 2 NTSC: The Masters of Cinema Series (UK)
Ibun Sarutobi Sasuke (異聞猿飛佐助) (The Strange Story of Sarutobi Sasuke, a.k.a. Samurai Spy) (1965)
DVD: Region 0 NTSC: The Criterion Collection (US)
Shinjû-ten Amijima (心中天網島) (Amijima Effaced to Heaven by Lovers' Suicide, a.k.a. Double Suicide) (1969)
DVD: Region 0 NTSC: The Criterion Collection (US)
Chinmoku / Silence (沈黙 / Silence) (1971)
DVD: Region 2 NTSC: The Masters of Cinema Series (UK)
Shōnen jidai / Childhood Days (少年時代 / Childhood Days) (1990)
DVD: Region 2 PAL: TOHO (Japan) Includes English subtitles.

References

External links

 The Movie Experience: Conversation with actress Shima Iwashita and director Masahiro Shinoda at the Institute of International Studies, UC Berkeley
 
 

1931 births
Living people
Japan Academy Prize for Director of the Year winners
Japanese film directors
Samurai film directors
Yakuza film directors
People from Gifu